Gottfried Schädlich (pseudonyms: Fried Noxius and G. F. W. Suixon; 20 March 1917 – 12 May 2007) was a German lieutenant colonel (Oberstleutnant) and writer.

Biography 
Schädlich joined the army of the Wehrmacht in 1937 after graduating from the Fürstenschule Grimma. During the Second World War, while fighting on the Eastern Front as captain and commander of the 1st Battalion of the 514th Grenadier Regiment of the 294th Infantry Division, he was awarded the German Cross in gold on January 13, 1944 and the Knight's Cross of the Iron Cross on July 9, 1944. The 294th Infantry Division participated in the Second Battle of Kharkov and Case Blue and fell in August 1944 in the Second Jassy–Kishinev offensive against the Red Army at Chișinău. As a major Schädlich was held as a Soviet prisoner of war from September 1944 to December 1949 in Camp 7150 in Gryazovets. There he worked in road construction, logging and construction work.

After returning to Germany, he first worked as a customs officer in Aachen. In 1956, he joined the newly formed German armed forces Bundeswehr as an officer and pursued a career at the Army Office (Heeresamt) in Cologne. When he retired in 1973, he was a lieutenant colonel (Oberstleutnant).

Schädlich published over 30 books, under his birth name a few military books and under his pseudonym "Fried Noxius" numerous books for children.

Reception 
According to a review in the Allgemeine Schweizerische Militaerzeitschrift, the Taschenbuch der Taktik (1963) published by E.S. Mittler & Sohn is considered to have "quite useful tips for the design of the tactical training". About Das Trojanische Pferd (1965) it said: "As a collection of ideas, the volume can be recommended to every trainer from group leader to battalion commander."

Awards 
  Close Combat Clasp in bronze
  Infantry Assault Badge in silver
   Wehrmacht Long Service Award 4th class (1941)
   Iron Cross 2nd class (9/4/1941)
   Iron Cross 1st class (4/8/1942)
   German Cross in gold (1/13/1944)
   Knight's Cross of the Iron Cross (7/9/1944)

Works

Military books 
Kurzgefasstes Lehrbuch für den Reserveoffizier und (Res.-)Offz.-Anwärter
Einführung und allgemeine Schulung (1960)
Taktische Schulung (1960)
Taschenbuch der Taktik
Taktische Grundsätze (1963)
Die Kampfarten und Entschlussaufgaben (1963)
Das Trojanische Pferd: Kriegslist - gestern und heute (1965)
Kriegslist: gestern und heute (1979)

Children and Youth books 
30 Gutenachtmärchen (1953)
Der grosse Ring (1957)
Der verlorene Schatten (1959)
Freiheit für Jacki (1961)
Der Geschichtenpeter: Viele kunterbunte Kindergeschichten (1963)
Der Geisterpfad: 11 Abenteuer- und Detektivgeschichten (1966)
Gute-Nacht-Geschichten für kleine Leute (1967)
Kennwort Schwarzer Brummer (1968)
Die Zwiebelprinzessin: Geschichten für Kinder (1968)
Herr Plum und der Papagei: Spannende Geschichten für Kinder (1969)
Der Riese Nimmersatt und andere Geschichten: 15 Geschichten aus der Märchenwelt zum Vorlesen und Selberlesen (1969)
Giraffe mit Knoten: Geschichten aus aller Welt für Kinder (1970)
Aktion Hilfe für Oliver (1970)
Spuk im Lindenhof: Spannende Abenteuer (1970)
Ein Ball rollt auf die Strasse: spannende Geschichten zur Verkehrserziehung (1972)
Der verkaufte Regenbogen: schnurriges Märchenallerlei (1972)
Der Geschichtenpeter: bunte Sachen zum Lesen und Lachen (1972)Gefährliches Geheimnis: Rätsel um einen unterirdischen Gang (1973)Im Netz der Schmuggler (1974)Gefahr am Platz der Gaukler (1974)Der Trick des Herrn van Loo (1976)Jonathan und der Geistervogel (1977)Zwei Augen zuviel: Detektivgeschichten (1978)Jonathan und der goldene Krake (1979)Ein gefährlicher Vogel (1979)Ein falscher Zug und andere spannende Geschichten (1979)Kennwort Gelbe Schaukel: Geheimnisse, Abenteuer, Spannung (1980)Privatdetektiv Jonathan JonathanDie Spur führt nach Marokko (1980)Die Geschäfte des Herrn van Loo (1981)Lasst euch den Mond nicht rauben (1986)Wie der Winter ins Land kam: Weihnachts- und Wintergeschichten für Kinder (1991)Der Eisblumenstrauss: Schnee- und Eisgeschichten'' (1992)

References

External links 
 

German Army officers of World War II
Recipients of the Knight's Cross of the Iron Cross
Recipients of the Gold German Cross
German military writers
German radio writers
1917 births
2007 deaths
People from Zwickau (district)
German prisoners of war in World War II held by the Soviet Union
Military personnel from Saxony
German children's writers